Gümüşkavak (literally "silver poplar") is a Turkish place name that may refer to the following places in Turkey:

 Gümüşkavak, Alanya, a village in the district of Alanya, Antalya Province
 Gümüşkavak, Posof, a village in the district of Posof, Ardahan Province

See also
 Gümüş (disambiguation), "silver"